"Surf City" is a 1963 song recorded by American music duo Jan and Dean about a fictitious surf spot where there are "two girls for every boy". Written by Brian Wilson and Jan Berry, it was the first surf song to become a national number-one hit.

In 1991, after moving to Huntington Beach, California, Dean Torrence helped convince elected officials that the town be officially nicknamed Surf City, USA.  In 2006, the official trademark of "Surf City, USA" was granted to Huntington Beach after several back-and-forth lawsuits between Huntington Beach and Santa Cruz. As of 2009, more than 65 businesses in the city included "Surf City" as part of their name.

Background
The first draft of the song, with the working title "Goody Connie Won't You Come Back Home", was written by Brian Wilson of the Beach Boys. While at a party with Jan Berry and Dean Torrence, Wilson played them "Surfin' U.S.A." on the piano. Berry and Torrence suggested that they do the song as a single, but Wilson refused, as "Surfin' U.S.A." was intended for the Beach Boys. Wilson then suggested that the duo record "Surf City" instead, demoing the opening, verse, and chorus. Wilson had lost interest in the song and believed he was never going to complete it himself. Berry later contributed additional writing to the song, while Torrence also contributed several phrases, but never insisted that he be given writing credit.

Recording
Hal Blaine, Glen Campbell, Earl Palmer, Bill Pitman, Ray Pohlman and Billy Strange are identified as players for the single per the American Federation of Musicians contract.

Release
Released in May 1963, two months later it became the first surf song to reach number one on national record charts, remaining at the top of the Billboard Hot 100 for two weeks.  The single crossed over to the Billboard R&B Chart where it peaked at number 3.  It also charted in the UK, reaching number 26. Before the single, Jan and Dean made music which was largely inspired by East Coast black vocal group records. The success of "Surf City" gave them a unique sound and identity which would be followed by five more top ten hits inspired by Los Angeles surf or hot rod life.

The Beach Boys' manager and Wilson's father Murry was reportedly irate about the song, believing that Brian had wasted a number one record which could have gone to his group, the Beach Boys. Brian later told Teen Beat, "I was proud of the fact that another group had had a number 1 track with a song I had written ... But dad would hear none of it. ... He called Jan a 'record pirate'."

The single's picture sleeve featured a photo of Jan and Dean with future actress Linda Gaye Scott. (A different photo from the same session appeared on the cover of their "Jan And Dean Take Linda Surfin'" album.)

Chart performance

Other versions
 1963 – The Delltones, single
 1964 - The Rip Chords, Three Window Coupe
 1966 - The Brackets (South African band), single 
 1986 – The Meteors, Surf City
 1989 – Sonic Surf City, Let's Go Surfin
 1993 – Ramones, Acid Eaters
 2001 - The Go-Go's, An All-Star Tribute to Brian Wilson (DVD)

In popular culture
The song was one of many California related songs played throughout "Sunshine Plaza" in the original Disney California Adventure.

References

1963 singles
Jan and Dean songs
Billboard Hot 100 number-one singles
Cashbox number-one singles
Ramones songs
Songs written by Jan Berry
Songs written by Brian Wilson
1963 songs
Liberty Records singles
California Sound